The discography of Moneybagg Yo, an American rapper, consists of four studio albums, one compilation album, 16 mixtapes (including one collaborative mixtape), and 44 singles (including 18 as a featured artist). His debut studio album, Reset, was released on November 2, 2018. His second studio album, 43va Heartless, was released on May 24, 2019. Moneybagg Yo's third studio album, Time Served, was released on January 10, 2020, and was certified gold by the RIAA. His fourth studio album, A Gangsta's Pain (2021), became his first number-one album on the Billboard 200 chart.

Albums

Studio albums

Mixtapes

Compilation albums

Singles

As lead artist

As featured artist

Promotional singles

Other charted and certified songs

Notes

References

Discographies of American artists
Hip hop discographies